"Queen of Peace" is a song by English indie rock band Florence and the Machine from their third studio album, How Big, How Blue, How Beautiful (2015). It was written by Florence Welch and Markus Dravs, and produced by the latter. The song was released on 4 September 2015 as the album's third single. "Queen of Peace" debuted at number 178 on the UK Singles Chart, peaking three weeks later at number 133, the band's first single to miss the top 100 since "Lover to Lover" in 2012.

Music video
A 10-minute double-feature music video for "Queen of Peace" and "Long & Lost", another track from How Big, How Blue, How Beautiful, was directed by Vincent Haycock and premiered on 27 July 2015. Shot on the Scottish island of Easdale, the short film is a part of a larger series of music videos centered on Welch and the storyline it creates known as The Odyssey.

Track listing
Digital download – Hot Chip Remix
"Queen of Peace" (Hot Chip Remix) – 6:25

Credits and personnel
Credits adapted from the liner notes of How Big, How Blue, How Beautiful.

Recording
 Engineered at The Pool and Urchin Studios (London)
 Strings, brass and flute recorded at Angel Recording Studios and The Pool (London)
 Mixed at Toast Studios (London)
 Mastered at Sterling Sound (New York City)

Personnel
Florence and the Machine
 Florence Welch – vocals, backing vocals
 Mark Saunders – bass
 Rob Ackroyd – electric guitar
 Rusty Bradshaw – piano

Additional personnel

 Markus Dravs – production
 Robin Baynton – engineering, strings recording, brass recording, flute recording
 Jonathan Sagis – engineering assistance
 Iain Berryman – engineering assistance
 Dan Cox – additional engineering
 Matt Ingram – drums, percussion
 Leo Abrahams – electric guitar
 Rusty Bradshaw – piano
 James Hallawell – Hammond organ
 Benson – additional keys, programming, flute arrangements, brass arrangements, string arrangements
 Janelle Martin – backing vocals
 Nim Miller – backing vocals
 Baby N'Sola – backing vocals
 Sally Herbert – flute arrangements, brass arrangements, string arrangements, orchestration, conducting
 Daniel Newell – piccolo trumpet, flugel, trumpet
 Nigel Black – French horn
 Pip Eastop – French horn
 Sam Jacobs – French horn
 Elise Campbell – French horn
 Andy Wood – trombone, Euphonium
 John Barclay – trumpet
 Philip Cobb – trumpet
 Andy Crowley – trumpet
 Tom Rees-Roberts – trumpet
 Ed Tarrant – Euphonium
 Richard Edwards – tenor trombone
 Oren Marshall – tuba
 Everton Nelson – violin
 Gillon Cameron – violin
 Rick Koster – violin
 Oli Langford – violin
 Bruce White – viola
 Nick Barr – viola
 Ian Burdge – cello
 Eliza Marshall – flute, alto flute
 Mat Bartram – strings recording, brass recording, flute recording
 Ronan Phelan – strings recording assistance, brass recording assistance, flute recording assistance
 Craig Silvey – mixing
 Eduardo de la Paz – mixing assistance
 Ted Jensen – mastering

Charts

Release history

References

2015 singles
2015 songs
Florence and the Machine songs
Island Records singles
Song recordings produced by Markus Dravs
Songs written by Florence Welch